The United States District Court for the Eastern District of California (in case citations, E.D. Cal.) is a federal court in the Ninth Circuit (except for patent claims and claims against the U.S. government under the Tucker Act, which are appealed to the Federal Circuit).

The District was created on March 18, 1966, with the division of the Northern and Southern districts, leading to the creation of the Central and Eastern districts.

The United States Attorney's Office for the Eastern District of California represents the United States in civil and criminal litigation in the court.  the United States Attorney is Phillip Talbert.

Organization of the court 

The United States District Court for the Eastern District of California is one of four federal judicial districts in California. Court for the District is held at the Robert E. Coyle U.S. Courthouse in Fresno and Robert T. Matsui U.S. Courthouse in Sacramento.

 Fresno Division comprises the following counties: Calaveras, Fresno, Inyo, Kern, Kings, Madera, Mariposa, Merced, Stanislaus, Tulare, and Tuolumne.
 Sacramento Division comprises the following counties: Alpine, Amador, Butte, Colusa, El Dorado, Glenn, Lassen, Modoc, Mono, Nevada, Placer, Plumas, Sacramento, San Joaquin, Shasta, Sierra, Siskiyou, Solano, Sutter, Tehama, Trinity, Yolo, and Yuba.
 Bakersfield Office hears misdemeanor and petty criminal offenses on federal lands and National Parks in Inyo and Kern counties. Court is held at Bakersfield, Edwards Air Force Base, and Ridgecrest.
 Redding Office hears misdemeanor and petty criminal offenses on federal lands and National Parks in Northern California. Court is held at Sierra Army Depot, Redding, and Susanville.
 Yosemite Office hears misdemeanor and petty criminal offenses in Yosemite National Park. National parks are under federal jurisdiction. The perennially large crowds of tourists at Yosemite create a unique situation justifying the presence of a courthouse inside the park itself.

Current judges 
:

Former judges

Chief judges

Succession of seats

Request for expansion 
The six sitting judges and three senior judges have submitted a draft letter to the members of the Senate and House of Representatives from the Eastern District in which they argue that population growth in the District has necessitated an increase in the number of District Judges.

See also 
 Courts of California
 List of current United States district judges
 List of United States federal courthouses in California

References

External links 
 United States District Court for the Eastern District of California
 United States Attorney for the Eastern District of California

California, Eastern
California law
Bakersfield, California
Government of Kern County, California
Government of Inyo County, California
Fresno, California
Redding, California
Government of Sacramento, California
Government of El Dorado County, California
Yosemite National Park
Government of Fresno County, California
1966 establishments in California
Courts and tribunals established in 1966